Kopperl (pronounced KOP-er-ul) is an unincorporated community in Bosque County, Texas, United States. It lies on the northwestern end of Lake Whitney, and has an estimated population of 225.

History
Kopperl was founded in 1881. Named after Galveston banker and railroad tycoon Moritz Kopperl, the town was established as a regional shipping point along the Gulf, Colorado and Santa Fe Railway. Its population peaked at 329 in 1904 before declining to 225 by the 1970s, a figure it has maintained fairly consistently since.

Shortly after midnight on June 15, 1960, a freak meteorological phenomenon, a heat burst, struck the community when a dying thunderstorm collapsed over Kopperl. The temperature increased rapidly, reportedly peaking near , 20° above the official all-time high for the state of Texas and exceeding the highest official temperature recorded on Earth. The storm, known as "Satan's Storm" by locals, soon became part of local folklore.

Kopperl was the town described in "Texas Trilogy", a song by Texas native Steve Fromholz and covered by Lyle Lovett.

Education
Kopperl is served by the Kopperl Independent School District.

Climate
The climate in this area is characterized by hot, humid summers and generally mild to cool winters.  According to the Köppen climate classification, Kopperl has a humid subtropical climate, Cfa on climate maps.

References

Further reading
 Tornadoes, Dark Days, Anomalous Precipitation and Related Weather Phenomena by William Corliss, Catalog of Geophysical Anomalies, 1983
 Extreme Weather; A Guide and Record Book by Christopher C. Burt
 Freaks of the Storm by Randy Cerveny

Unincorporated communities in Bosque County, Texas
Unincorporated communities in Texas
Populated places established in 1881
1881 establishments in Texas